Joshua Christian Shirley (born January 4, 1992) is an American football linebacker who is a free agent. He played college football at Washington before transferring to UNLV.

Professional career

Oakland Raiders
Shirley was with the Oakland Raiders' practice squad for two weeks.

Tampa Bay Buccaneers
Shirley was signed to the Tampa Bay Buccaneers practice squad on October 6, 2015. He was promoted to the active roster on October 31, 2015. The team waived tackle Reid Fragel to make room for Shirley. 
On December 15, 2015, Shirley was released from the Buccaneers.

Second stint with Oakland Raiders
On December 17, 2015, it was announced Shirley would again be joining the Oakland Raiders practice squad.

Seattle Seahawks
On January 20, 2016, Shirley signed a futures contract with the Seattle Seahawks. On May 4, 2016, the Seahawks waived Shirley. On August 30, 2016, he was placed on injured reserve but was released on September 5, 2016.

Chicago Bears
On December 14, 2016 Shirley was signed to the Bears' practice squad. He was promoted to the active roster on December 31, 2016. He was released by the Bears on January 9, 2017.

References

External links
Chicago Bears bio
Tampa Bay Buccaneers bio

1992 births
Living people
American football linebackers
American football defensive ends
Washington Huskies football players
UNLV Rebels football players
Oakland Raiders players
Tampa Bay Buccaneers players
Seattle Seahawks players
Chicago Bears players
BC Lions players